Derek Isles (born 14 October 1943) is a former English cricketer: a wicket-keeper who played a single first-class match, for Worcestershire against the Pakistanis at Worcester in 1967.

In the game against the Pakistanis, his most notable achievement was his second-innings stumping of opener and captain Hanif Mohammad. He also took one catch, and made 17 and 4; both innings were not out meaning that he does not have a career batting average.

In the Minor Counties and Second XI Championships, Isles played for the seconds of no fewer than five counties between 1962 and 1968.

Notes

References

English cricketers
Worcestershire cricketers
1943 births
Living people
Wicket-keepers